The .45-70, also known as the .45-70 Government, is a .45 caliber rifle cartridge originally holding 70 grains of black powder that was developed at the U.S. Army's Springfield Armory for use in the Springfield Model 1873. It was a replacement for the stop-gap .50-70 Government cartridge, which had been adopted in 1866, one year after the end of the American Civil War, and is known by collectors as the "Trapdoor Springfield."

Nomenclature 
The new cartridge was completely identified as the .45-70-405, but was also referred to as the ".45 Government" cartridge in commercial catalogs. The nomenclature of the time was based on three properties of the cartridge:
 .45: nominal diameter of bullet, measured in decimal inches, i.e., 0.458 inches (11.63 mm);
 70: volume of black powder, measured in grains, i.e., 70 grains;
 405: weight of lead bullet, measured in grains, i.e., 405 grains (26.38 g).

A skilled shooter, firing at a known range, could consistently hit targets that were 6 ×  at —the Army standard target.

After the Sandy Hook tests of 1879, a new variation of the .45-70 cartridge was produced: the .45-70-500, which fired a heavier, 500 grain, (32.57 g) bullet. The heavier bullet produced significantly superior ballistics and could reach ranges of 3,350 yards (3,120 m), which were beyond the maximum range of the .45-70-405. At those ranges, the bullets struck point-first at a roughly 30-degree angle, penetrating three 1-inch (2.5 cm) thick oak boards, and then traveled to a depth of eight inches (20 cm) into the sand of the beach. It was hoped the longer range of the .45-70-500 would allow effective volley fire at ranges beyond those normally expected of infantry fire.

Bullet diameter 
As was standard practice with many early commercially-produced U.S. cartridges, specially-constructed bullets were often "paper patched", or wrapped in a couple of layers of thin paper. This patch served to seal the bore and keep the soft lead bullet from coming in contact with the bore, preventing leading (see internal ballistics). Like the cloth or paper patches used in muzzle-loading firearms, the paper patch fell off soon after the bullet left the bore. Paper-patched bullets were made of soft lead,  in diameter. Paper patched bullets are still available, and some black-powder shooters still "roll their own" paper-patched bullets for hunting and competitive shooting. Arsenal loadings for the .45-70-405 and .45-70-500 government cartridges generally used groove diameter grease groove bullets of  diameter.

History 

The predecessor to the .45-70 was the .50-70-450 cartridge, adopted in 1866 and used until 1873 in a variety of rifles, many of them were percussion rifled muskets converted to trapdoor action breechloaders. The conversion consisted of milling out the rear of the barrel for the trapdoor breechblock, and placing a .50 caliber "liner" barrel inside the .58 caliber barrel. The .50-70 was popular among hunters, as the bullet was larger than the .44 caliber and also hit harder (see terminal ballistics), but the military decided as early as 1866 that a .45 caliber bullet would provide increased range, penetration and accuracy. The .50-70 was nevertheless adopted as a temporary solution until a significantly improved rifle and cartridge could be developed.

The result of the quest for a more accurate, flatter shooting .45 caliber cartridge and firearm was the Springfield trapdoor rifle. Like the .50-70, the .45-70 used a copper center-fire case design. A reduced power loading was also adopted for use in the Trapdoor carbine. This had a 55 grain (3.6 g) powder charge.

Also issued was the .45-70 "Forager" round, which contained a thin wooden bullet filled with birdshot, intended for hunting small game to supplement the soldiers' rations. This round in effect made the .45-70 rifle into a 49 gauge shotgun.

The .45-caliber Springfield underwent a number of modifications over the years, the principal one being a strengthened breech starting in 1884. A new, 500 grain (32 g) bullet was adopted in that year for use in the stronger arm. The M1873 and M1884 Springfield rifles were the principal small arms of the U.S. Army until 1893.

The .45-70 round was also used in several Gatling gun models from 1873 until it was superseded by the .30 Army round beginning with the M1893 Gatling gun. Some .45-70 Gatling guns were used on U.S. Navy warships launched in the 1880s and 1890s.

The Navy used the .45-70 caliber in several rifles: the M1873 and M1884 Springfield, the Model 1879 Lee Magazine Navy contract rifle, and the Remington-Lee, the last two being magazine-fed turnbolt repeating rifles. The Marine Corps used the M1873 and M1884 Springfield in .45-70 until 1897, when supplies of the new M1895 Lee Navy rifle in 6mm Lee Navy, adopted two years before by the Navy, were finally made available.

Realizing that single-shot black-powder rifles were rapidly becoming obsolete, the U.S. Army adopted the Norwegian-designed .30 Army caliber as the Springfield Model 1892 in 1893. However, the .45-70 continued in service with the National Guard, Navy, and Marine Corps until 1897. The .45-70 was last used in quantity during the Spanish–American War, and was not completely purged from the inventory until well into the 20th century. Many surplus rifles were given to reservation Indians as subsistence hunting rifles and now carry Indian markings.

The .45-70 cartridge is still used by the U.S. military today, in the form of the "cartridge, caliber .45, line throwing, M32," a blank cartridge which is used in a number of models of line throwing guns used by the Navy and Coast Guard. Early models of these line throwing guns were made from modified Trapdoor and Sharps rifles, while later models are built on break-open single-shot rifle actions.

Sporting use 

As is usual with military ammunition, the .45-70 was an immediate hit among sportsmen, and the .45-70 has survived to the present day. Today, the traditional 405-grain (26.2 g) load is considered adequate for any North American big game within its range limitations, including the great bears, and it does not destroy edible meat on smaller animals such as deer due to the bullet's low velocity. It is very good for big-game hunting in brush or heavy timber where the range is usually short. The .45-70, when loaded with the proper bullets at appropriate velocities, has been used to hunt the African "big-five." The .45-70 has been loaded and used to hunt everything from birds to elephants and the cartridge is still undergoing new development work.

The trajectory of the bullets is very steep, which makes for a very short point-blank range. This was not a significant problem at the time of introduction, as the .45-70 was a fairly flat-shooting cartridge for its time. Most modern shooters use much higher velocity cartridges, relying on the long point-blank range, and rarely using telescopic sights' elevation adjustments, calibrated iron sights, or hold-overs. Sights found on early cartridge hunting rifles were quite sophisticated, with a long sighting radius, wide range of elevation, and vernier adjustments to allow precise calibration of the sights for a given range. Even the military "creedmoor"-type rifle sights were calibrated and designed to handle extended ranges, flipping up to provide several degrees of elevation adjustment if needed. The .45-70 is a popular choice for black-powder cartridge shooting events, and replicas of most of the early rifles, including Trapdoor, Sharps, and Remington single-shot rifles, are often available.

The .45-70 is a long-range caliber, and accurate use requires knowledge of windage and elevation by minute of angle and a sense for estimating distance in these calculations. The .45-70 retains great popularity among American hunters, and is still offered by several commercial ammunition manufacturers. Even when loaded with modern smokeless powders, pressures are usually kept low for safety in antique rifles and their replicas. Various modern sporting rifles are chambered for the .45-70, and some of these benefit from judicious handloading of homemade ammunition with markedly higher pressure and ballistic performance. Others, which reproduce the original designs still take the original load, but are not strong enough for anything with higher pressures. In a rifle such as the Siamese Mauser (commonly converted to fire .45-70 due to it being the only Mauser 98 derivative designed to feed rimmed cartridges, and the limited availability of ammunition for its original 8×50mmR chambering) or a Ruger No. 1 single-shot rifle, it can be handloaded to deliver good performance even on big African game. The .45-70 has also been used in double rifles since the development of the Colt 1878 rifle and the more modern replicas, like the Kodiak Mark IV.

In addition to its traditional use in rifles, Thompson Center Arms has offered a .45-70 barrel in both pistol and rifle lengths for their "Contender" single-shot pistol, one of the most potent calibers offered in the Contender frame. Even the shortest barrel, 14 inches, is capable of producing well over 2,500 ft·lbf (2,700 J) of energy, double the power of most .44 Magnum loadings, and a Taylor KO Factor as high as 40 with some loads. Recent .45-70 barrels are available with efficient muzzle brakes that significantly reduce muzzle rise and also help attenuate the recoil. The Magnum Research BFR is a heavier gun at approximately 4.5 pounds, helping it have much more manageable recoil.

Only with the recent introduction of ultra-magnum revolver cartridges, such as the .500 S&W Magnum, have production handguns begun to eclipse the .45-70 Contender in the field of big-game-capable handguns.

See also 
 11 mm caliber other cartridges of similar caliber.
 .444 Marlin
 .450 Marlin
 .458 SOCOM
 List of rifle cartridges
 Table of handgun and rifle cartridges

References

External links 

 Breech-Loaders In The United States, The Engineer, 11 January 1867, on the adoption of a military breech-loading rifle and cartridge
 Shoot! Magazine article on the .50-70 cartridge
 Randolph, Captain W. S., 5th US Artillery Service and Description of Gatling Guns, 1878

Pistol and rifle cartridges
Military cartridges
Weapons and ammunition introduced in 1873
Rimmed cartridges